Canga may refer to:

Canga's bead symptom, the irregular appearance of uterus and nodular structures in tuba uterina observed in patients with genital tuberculosis
Cap. FAP Pedro Canga Rodríguez Airport (IATA: TBP, ICAO: SPME), airport serving Tumbes, Peru
Pseudopaludicola canga, species of frog in the family Leptodactylidae
 Canga (harvestman), a genus in family Neogoveidae

People with the surname
José Canga-Argüelles (1770–1843), Spanish statesman
María Cangá (born 1962), female judoka from Ecuador

See also
Cangas (disambiguation)
Kanga (disambiguation)